Zafin is a banking software enterprise platform company that provides relationship-based pricing to banks and financial institutions.

The company has offices in Canada, USA, UK, Germany, Dubai, Malaysia, South Africa, and India. The company is founded and led by Karim Somji. In March 2020, Zafin announced the appointment of Venkataraman Balasubramanian to its senior leadership team as executive vice president and chief technology officer.

Products
Zafin's main product, miRevenue, is used by banks to enable relationship-based pricing and enterprise billing functionalities.

Clients
The company's clients include banks and financial institutions such as Standard Chartered Bank, Bank of the West, CIMB, ZKB, Nedbank, HDFC Bank, National Bank of Abu Dhabi, and SEB.

Partners
Zafin sells with IT partners including IBM, Silverlake, CGI and Dell Services.

Awards
Zafin won a Technology Award in 2007, courtesy of The Banker magazine, for Best Implementation in the Retail Banking Project category. The award represented the first implementation of miRevenue in a bank and was awarded for the retail banking implementation at HDFC Bank.

Zafin was recognized as one of the "Top 10 FinTech Companies to Watch" by American Banker in 2013.

Zafin was listed on the Deloitte Fast 50 and Deloitte Fast 500 lists in 2014. The company experienced 865% revenue growth over the previous five-year period

Projects
Zafin completed a customized pricing system for ZKB in 2008. The complexity of the integration, which resulted in allowing ZKB to perform relationship-based pricing for large customers in real time, was featured in an academic text, "Management von Integrationsprojekten: Konzeptionelle Grundlagen und Fallstudien aus fachlicher und IT-Sicht", edited by Dr. Robert Winter of the University of St. Gallen.

In October 2017, the company launched new fintech partner ecosystem to assist the banks with a one-stop origination platform.

References

External links
 
{https://bestjobguru.com/how-to-apply-for-loan-without-intrest-easy-steps/     */how to get a loan}
Companies based in Vancouver
Financial services companies of Canada
Banking software companies
Financial software companies
Banking technology
Financial technology companies
Canadian brands
Canadian companies established in 2002